The Aquinas Holy Family Colts Football Club is a rugby league football club that was formed in 1992 and competes in the Cronulla-Sutherland District Rugby Football League; the club was formed in conjunction with both the Holy Family junior school and Aquinas College after they entered teams in the Cronulla Sutherland Schoolboys Knockout Competition. The club is based out of Illawong where its headquarters are located.

The Aquinas Holy Family Colts club currently field teams from Under 6 age groups all the way up to under A Reserves and draws the vast majority of its players from both the Aquinas College and Holy Family schools as well as the surrounding areas such as Illawong, Bangor and Menai often having to compete with local rivals the Menai Roosters.

Notable Juniors
Bronson Xerri (2019- Cronulla Sharks)
Kyle Flanagan (2018- Cronulla Sharks)
Jayden Brailey (2017- Cronulla Sharks)
Blayke Brailey (2019- Cronulla Sharks)

See also

List of rugby league clubs in Australia

External links
Official website
LeagueNet Aquinas Holy Family Colts website

Rugby league teams in Sydney
Rugby clubs established in 1992
1992 establishments in Australia